The Islamic Democratic Party (IDP) was an Islamic political party from the Maldives. On June 2, 2005, the country's 50 member parliament voted unanimously to allow and operate political parties in Maldives. IDP subsequently submitted its registration and was registered. IDP was officially granted registration on December 12, 2005. The founding members are Umar Naseer, Mohamed Haneef, Ahmed Inaz, Mohamed Ibrahim Didi, Abdulla Waheed and Mahamed Hassan Manik.

Umar Naseer was a Police officer respected by his superiors and subordinates alike. He was trained in UK in other countries. He operates a security firm called Alarms Pvt Ltd. and also Whale Submarine, which is a tourist submarine for enthusiasts who wants to look into the underwater world of Maldives. 

Mohamed Haneef was a police officer, who resigned from the military and began his political career. He is well known among Maldivians as the person who organised two strikes against then President Ibrahim Nasir in 1975.

The party was dissolved in 2013.

External links
  Official website

2005 establishments in the Maldives
Islamic organisations based in the Maldives
Islamic political parties in the Maldives
Political parties disestablished in 2013
Political parties established in 2005
2013 disestablishments in Asia